Snodgrass is a surname of Scottish origin. It may also refer to the following places:

In the United States
 Snodgrass Tavern, a National Register of Historic Places site in Berkeley County, West Virginia
 Snodgrass Hill, site of the American Civil War Battle of Chickamauga in 1863
 Snodgrass Mountain at Crested Butte, Colorado
 Snodgrass Cemetery in Saluda, Indiana
 Snodgrass Cemetery outside Vienna, Missouri
 Snodgrass Cemetery in Gandeeville, West Virginia
 Snodgrass Lake in Matanuska-Susitna Borough, Alaska
 Snodgrass Lake in Crow Wing County, Minnesota
 Ellis C. Snodgrass Memorial Bridge, Yarmouth, Maine

Elsewhere
 Snodgrass Island, Antarctica
 Snodgrass Lagoon on Waterloo Creek in Australia, site of the Waterloo Creek massacre in 1838
 Snodgrass Road, Westport, New Zealand
 Snodgrass Village, near River Garnock, Scotland - see Ardeer Platform railway station